DRCOG may refer to either:

Denver Regional Council of Governments
DObst RCOG, Diploma of the Royal College of Obstetricians and Gynaecologists